During the Iron Age and classical antiquity, Libya (from Greek Λιβύη: Libyē, which came from Berber: Libu) referred to North Africa. Berbers occupied the area for thousands of years before the recording of history in ancient Egypt. Climate changes affected the locations of the settlements.

More narrowly, Libya could also refer to the country immediately west of Egypt, viz Marmarica (Libya Inferior) and Cyrenaica (Libya Superior). The Libyan Sea or Mare Libycum was the part of the Mediterranean Sea south of Crete, between Cyrene and Alexandria.

In the Hellenistic period, the Berbers were known collectively as Libyans, a Greek term for the inhabitants of the Berber world. Their lands were called "Libya" and referred to the known African continent at that time, excluding Sub-Saharan Africa which was known as Aethiopia. Egypt contains the Siwa Oasis, which was part of ancient Libya. The Siwi language, a Berber language, is still spoken in the area.

Name 

The name is based on the ethnonym Libu ( Líbyes). The name Libya (in use since 1934 for the modern country formerly known as Tripolitania and Barca) was the Latin designation for the region of the Maghreb, from the Ancient Greek ( Libúē,  Libúā). In Classical Greece, the term had a broader meaning, encompassing the continent that later (second century BC) became known as Africa, which, in antiquity, was assumed to constitute one third of the world's land mass, Europe and Asia combined making up the other two thirds.

The Libu are attested since the Late Bronze Age as inhabiting the region (Egyptian R'bw, Punic:  lby). The oldest known references to the Libu date to Ramesses II and his successor Merneptah, pharaohs of the Nineteenth Dynasty of Egypt, during the 13th century BC. LBW appears as an ethnic name on the Merneptah Stele.

Menelaus had travelled there on his way home from Troy; it was a land of wonderful richness, where the lambs have horns as soon as they are born, where ewes lamb three times a year and no shepherd ever goes short of milk, meat or cheese.

Homer names Libya, in Odyssey (IX.95; XXIII.311). Homer used the name in a geographic sense, while he called its inhabitants "Lotus-eaters". After Homer, Aeschylus, Pindar, and other ancient Greek writers used the name. Herodotus (1.46) used Λιβύη Libúē to indicate the African continent; the Líbues proper were the light-skinned North Africans, while those south of Egypt (and Elephantine on the Nile) were known to him as "Aethiopians"; this was also the understanding of later Greek geographers such as Diodorus Siculus, Strabo, etc.

When the Greeks actually settled in the real Libya in the 630s, the old name taken from the Egyptians was applied by the Greeks of Cyrenaica, who may have coexisted with the Libu. Later, the name appeared in the Hebrew language, written in the Bible as Lehabim and Lubim, indicating the ethnic population and the geographic territory as well. 
In the neo-Punic inscriptions, it was written as Lby for the masculine noun, and Lbt for the feminine noun of Libyan.

Latin absorbed the name from Greek and the Punic languages. The Romans would have known them before their colonization of North Africa because of the Libyan role in the Punic Wars against the Romans. The Romans used the name Líbues, but only when referring to Barca and the Libyan Desert of Egypt. The other Libyan territories were called "Africa".

Classical Arabic literature called Libya Lubya, . Modern Arabic uses Libya. The Lwatae, the tribe of Ibn Battuta, as the Arabs called it, was a Berber tribe that mainly was situated in Cyrenaica. This tribe may have ranged from the Atlantic Ocean to modern Libya, however, and was referred to by Corippius as Laguatan; he linked them with the Maures. Ibn Khaldun's Muqaddimah states Luwa was an ancestor of this tribe. He writes that the Berbers add an "a" and "t" to the name for the plural forms. Subsequently, it became Lwat.

Conversely, the Arabs adopted the name as a singular form, adding an "h" for the plural form in Arabic. Ibn Khaldun disagrees with Ibn Hazam, who claimed, mostly on the basis of Berber sources, that the Lwatah, in addition to the Sadrata and the Mzata, were from the Qibts (Egyptians). According to Ibn Khaldun, this claim is incorrect because Ibn Hazam had not read the books of the Berber scholars.

Oric Bates, a historian, considers that the name Libu or LBW would be derived from the name Luwatah whilst the name Liwata is a derivation of the name Libu.

History 

Compared with the history of Egypt, historians know little about the history of Libya, as there are few surviving written records. Information on ancient Libya comes from archaeological evidence and historic sources written by Egypt's neighbors, the ancient Greeks, Romans, and Byzantines, and from Arabs of Medieval times.

Since Neolithic times, the climate of North Africa has become drier. A reminder of the desertification of the area is provided by megalithic remains, which occur in great variety of form and in vast numbers in presently arid and uninhabitable wastelands : dolmens and circles akin to Stonehenge, cairns, underground cells excavated in rock, barrows topped with huge slabs, and step-pyramid-like mounds. Most remarkable are the trilithons, some still standing, some fallen, which occur isolated or in rows, and consist of two squared uprights standing on a common pedestal that supports a huge transverse beam. In the Terrgurt valley, Cowper says, "There had been originally no less than eighteen or twenty megalithic trilithons, in a line, each with its massive altar placed before it".

In ancient times, the Phoenicians/Carthaginians, the Neo-Assyrian Empire, the Persian Achaemenid Empire (see Libya (satrapy)), the Macedonian Empire of Alexander the Great and his Ptolemaic successors from Egypt ruled variously parts of Libya. With the Roman conquest, the entire region of present-day Libya became part of the Roman Empire. Following the fall of the Empire, Vandals, and local representatives of the Byzantine Empire also ruled all or parts of Libya. The territory of modern Libya had separate histories until Roman times, as Tripoli and Cyrenaica.

Cyrenaica, by contrast, was Greek before it was Roman. It was also known as Pentapolis, the "five cities" being Cyrene (near the village of Shahat) with its port of Apollonia (Marsa Susa), Arsinoe (Tocra), Berenice (Benghazi) and Barca (Merj). From the oldest and most famous of the Greek colonies, the fertile coastal plain took the name of Cyrenaica.

These five cities were also known as the Western Pentapolis; not to be confused with the Pentapolis of the Roman era on the current west Italian coast.

Geography
The exact boundaries of ancient Libya are unknown.

To the ancient Greeks, Libya was one of the three known continents along with Asia and Europe. In this sense, Libya was the whole known African continent to the west of the Nile Valley and extended south of Egypt. Herodotus described the inhabitants of Africa as two peoples: The Libyans in northern Africa and the Ethiopians in the south. According to Herodotus, Libya began where Ancient Egypt ended, and extended to Cape Spartel, south of Tangier on the Atlantic coast.

Modern geographers suspect that ancient Libyans may have experienced loss of forests, reliable fresh water sources, and game availability as the area became more desert-like.

Later sources 
After the Egyptians, the Greeks; Romans; and Byzantines mentioned various other tribes in Libya. Later tribal names differ from the Egyptian ones but, probably, some tribes were named in the Egyptian sources and the later ones, as well. The Meshwesh-tribe represents this assumption. Scholars believe it would be the same tribe called Mazyes by Hektaios and Maxyes by Herodotus, while it was called "Mazaces" and "Mazax" in Latin sources. All those names are similar to the name used by the Berbers for themselves, Imazighen.

Late period sources give more detailed descriptions of Libya and its inhabitants. The ancient historian Herodotus describes Libya and the Libyans in his fourth book, known as The Libyan Book. Pliny the Elder, Diodorus Siculus, and Procopius also contributed to what is now primary source material on ancient Libya and the Libyans.

Ibn Khaldun, who dedicated the main part of his book Kitab el'ibar, which is known as "The history of the Berbers", did not use the names Libya and Libyans, but instead used Arabic names: The Old Maghreb, (El-Maghrib el-Qadim), and the Berbers (El-Barbar or El-Barabera(h)).

Ancient Libyan (Berber) tribes 
There were many tribes in ancient Libya, including the now extinct Psylli, with the Libu being the most prominent. The ancient Libyans were mainly pastoral nomads, living off their goats, sheep and other livestock. Milk, meat, hides and wool were gathered from their livestock for food, tents and clothing.

Ancient Egyptian sources describe Libyan men with long hair, braided and bearded, neatly parted from different sides and decorated with feathers attached to leather bands around the crown of the head while wearing thin robes of antelope hide, dyed and printed, crossing the shoulder and coming down until mid calf length to make a robe. Older men kept long braided beards. Women wore the same robes as men, plaited, decorated hair and both sexes wore heavy jewelry. Depictions of Libyans in Egyptian reliefs show prominent and numerous tattoos, very similar to traditional Berber tattoos still seen today. Weapons included bows and arrows, hatchets, spears and daggers.

The Libyan script that was used in Libya was mostly a funerary script. It is difficult to understand, and there are a number of variations.

Ibn Khaldun divided the Berbers into the Batr and the Baranis.

Herodotus divided them into Eastern Libyans and Western Libyans. Eastern Libyans were nomadic shepherds east of Lake Tritonis. Western Libyans were sedentary farmers who lived west of Lake Tritonis. At one point, a catastrophic change reduced the vast body of fresh water to a seasonal lake or marsh.

Ibn Khaldun and Herodotus distinguish the Libyans on the basis of their lifestyles rather than ethnic background. Modern historians tend to follow Herodotus's distinction. Examples include Oric Bates in his book The Eastern Libyans. Some other historians have used the modern name of the Berbers in their works, such as the French historian Gabriel Camps.

The Libyan tribes mentioned in these sources were: "Adyrmachidae", "Giligamae", "Asbystae", "Marmaridae", "Auschisae", "Nasamones", "Macae", "Lotus-eaters (or Lotophagi)", "Garamantes", "Gaetulians", "Mauri", and "Luwatae", as well as many others.

See also 
History of North Africa
North Africa during Antiquity
Necropolis of Cyrene

References and notes

External links 

What Happened to the Ancient Libyans?, Chasing Sources across the Sahara from Herodotus to Ibn Khaldun by Richard L. Smith.
 Bunson, Margaret. "Libya." Encyclopedia of Ancient Egypt. New York: Facts on File, Inc., 1991
Who Lived in Africa before the Roman Conquest?

 

Historical regions
Ancient Greek geography of North Africa